The 1988 BCE Canadian Masters was a professional ranking snooker tournament, that was held from 26 October to 5 November 1988 at the Minkler Auditorium, Toronto, Canada. This was the first and only year the event was held as a ranking event. All preliminary rounds were played in the UK and only the last 32 players travelled to Canada.
 
Jimmy White won the tournament by defeating Steve Davis nine frames to four in the final.


Main draw

References

Canadian Masters (snooker)
Canadian Masters
Canadian Masters
Canadian Masters
Canadian Masters